Asselin is a surname. Notable people with the surname include:

 Christopher Asselin (born 1969), American former politician
 Edmund Tobin Asselin (1920–1999), Canadian politician, administrator and businessman
 Émile Asselin (born 1996), Canadian curler
 Félix Asselin (born 1994), Canadian curler
 Guillaume Asselin (born 1992), Canadian ice hockey player
 Gérard Asselin (1950–2013), Canadian politician
 Jacques J.A. Asselin, Canadian diplomat
 Janelle Asselin (born 1983), American comic book editor
 Jean-Louis Asselin de Cherville (1772–1822), French Orientalist
 Joe Asselin (born 1977), American musician
 Jonathan Asselin (born 1958), Canadian equestrian
 Joseph-Omer Asselin (1890–1961), Canadian businessman and politician
 Josh Asselin (born 1978), American basketball player
 Kevin Asselin (born 1985), Canadian ice hockey player
 Louis-Napoléon Asselin (1850–1921), Canadian lawyer and politician
 Marie-Anne Asselin (1888–1971), Canadian mezzo-soprano
 Marie-Claude Asselin (born 1962), Canadian freestyle skier
 Mario Asselin, Canadian politician
 Martial Asselin (1924–2013), Canadian politician
 Mathieu Asselin (born 1973), French-Venezuelan photographer
 Maurice Asselin (1882–1947), French artist
 Michèle Asselin, Canadian activist
 Olivar Asselin (1874–1937), Canadian writer and journalist
 Olivia Asselin (born 2004), Canadian freestyle skier
 Olivier Asselin, Canadian film director and screenwriter
 Patrick Tobin Asselin (1930–2005), Canadian politician
 Pierre-Aurèle Asselin (1881–1964), French Canadian furrier and tenor singer
 Robert Asselin (born 1974), Canadian author and public policy expert
 Roland Asselin (1917–2003), Canadian fencer

French-language surnames